Anne Cathrine Juel (1738-1809) was a Danish businesswoman.

Biography 
She owned and managed a famous coffee house in Copenhagen, known as the meeting place of the Det norske Selskab from 1772 to 1792. She was a muse to many of the members of the society, and several poems are dedicated to her by its members. 

In 2005, a memorial plaque was placed on the Thomas Angell House in Trondheim, where she died.

References

 A. H. Winsnes: Det Norske Selskab 1772-1812. Aschehoug 1924.

1738 births
1809 deaths
18th-century Danish businesswomen
18th-century Danish businesspeople